The 2021 Lamar Hunt U.S. Open Cup was planned to be the 107th edition of the U.S. Open Cup, a knockout cup competition in American soccer. After the 2020 competition was suspended and ultimately canceled due to the COVID-19 pandemic, the United States Soccer Federation announced that qualification for the 2021 Open Cup would be canceled and all 100 teams that had qualified for that competition would be invited back. On February 8, 2021, the U.S. Soccer Federation backtracked and stated that only 24 teams would be allowed to participate in a new abbreviated tournament, with the exact qualification details still being determined.

On March 29, US Soccer announced the tournament would be downsized to 16 teams who would play four rounds. The opening round was canceled due to the COVID-19 pandemic, while the Open Cup Committee will convene to decide whether the competition can proceed. The tournament will feature eight Major League Soccer teams, four USL Championship teams, one National Independent Soccer Association team, one USL League One team, and two teams from the Open Division determined by a random draw.

On April 16, US Soccer announced that the tournament would not be held in the spring due to a combination of financial and logistical issues, and that they were evaluating holding the tournament later in the year.

On July 20, US Soccer finally announced that the tournament would be cancelled for 2021 and would resume in 2022.

Atlanta United FC won the previous tournament after defeating Minnesota United FC in the 2019 final.

Qualification 

The list of eligible teams for the 2021 tournament features 102 teams including 64 professional sides. Two professional teams became eligible since the 2019 tournament (Rio Grande Valley FC Toros and FC Tucson) and two have folded (Reno 1868 FC and 2019 quarterfinalists Saint Louis FC). Entrants include the American clubs from across the soccer leagues system, with timing determined by league division. These include the 24 American clubs of Major League Soccer, as well as the teams in the USL Championship and USL League One that are not owned or operated by an MLS and USL Championship (in case of USL League One). ; MLS-affiliated clubs from these leagues are eligible. In addition, clubs from the National Independent Soccer Association (NISA), a sanctioned Division III league, are set to take part. This would be the first time two professional leagues from the same tier have both competed in the tournament since 2017.

Both Crossfire Redmond and GPS Portland Phoenix qualified for the 2020 tournament through league results in the National Premier Soccer League and USL League Two respectively. However, neither were listed as eligible in U.S. Soccer's announcement.

The four participating USL Championship teams will be the USL Championship 2020 semifinal playoff teams: El Paso Locomotive FC, Louisville City FC, Phoenix Rising FC, Tampa Bay Rowdies.

Number of teams by state 
The eligible 2021 field represents a total of 34 states and the District of Columbia.

States without a team in the Open Cup: Alaska, Arkansas, Delaware, Hawaii, Idaho, Maine, Mississippi, Missouri, Montana, New Hampshire, North Dakota, Rhode Island, South Dakota, Vermont, West Virginia, and Wyoming.

Broadcasting
All matches from the first round to the final were expected to be streamed on ESPN+. U.S. Soccer and ESPN signed a 4-year deal to air the tournament in 2019.

References

External links
  at U.S. Soccer
 TheCup.us, an independent news site covering the U.S. Open Cup

 
U.S. Open Cup
U.S. Open Cup
U.S. Open Cup, 2021
US Open Cup, 2021